Huawei Mobile Services (HMS) is a collection of proprietary services and application programming interfaces (APIs) developed by Huawei Technologies Co., Ltd. It is typically installed on Huawei devices running the Android operating system including devices already distributed with Google Mobile Services.

HMS consists of seven key services and HMS Core which supports app development on the platform. These are Huawei ID, Cloud, AppGallery, Themes, Huawei Video, Browser, Assistant. Huawei Quick Apps is the alternative to Google Instant Apps.

By January 2020, over 50,000 apps had been integrated with HMS Core. Its rival, Google Mobile Services has 3 million apps on Google's Play Store. The AppGallery claimed 180 billion downloads in 2019.

In March 2020, HMS was used by 650 million monthly active users across 170 countries.

A Chinese phone manufacturer, LeTV, hosted a smartphone business communication meeting in Beijing on September 27, 2021, to demonstrate its phone, the LeTV S1. This was the first smartphone from a third-party manufacturer to include Huawei Mobile Services (HMS).

HMS on Android and HarmonyOS 
Huawei Mobile Services on Android goes all the way back to August 2016 as Huawei ID services for phones, basic functionalities for Huawei P9 series.

However, in May 2019 proved to be a significant change to HMS when Google was prohibited from working with Huawei on any new devices. This also included bundling Google's Apps, including Gmail, Maps and YouTube.

Any new Huawei devices launched after 16 May 2019 were unable to receive updates from Google services and would be considered 'uncertified' meaning Huawei's only solution at the time was to turn HMS into a genuine competitor to Google and incentivize app developers to utilize the platform.

Huawei officially launched Huawei Mobile Services in China on December 24, 2019, as a beta. Huawei expanded Huawei Mobile Services in Europe in February 2020 and other markets in Asia, Latin America, Middle East & Africa, Canada, Mexico followed outside banned US market.

HMS is available on the Honor 9X Pro, View 30 Pro, Huawei Mate XS. HMS is also available, alongside GMS, on many other Huawei models launched before the ban.

Huawei promised developers it would take, “less than 10 minutes", to port their app over to HMS - to illustrate the ease of portability between Google's Play Store and the HMS AppGallery.

On July 15, 2021, Huawei expanded HMS with HarmonyOS support with HMS Core 6.0 for app development with native HAP based apps in all types of devices from smartphones, tablets, smart screens, smartwatches, and car machines. Including various third-party development frameworks, such as React Native, Cordova, etc.

On May 13, 2022, it has been reported that Huawei Mobile Services will fully support open source version of HarmonyOS, OpenHarmony by the end of 2022

HMS Core 
HMS Core is a hub for Huawei Mobile Services and serves as a toolkit for app development on Huawei devices. The core comprises Development, Growth and Monetizing and was created as a replacement for Google Mobile Services (GMS) Core. HMS Core 5.0 debuted in September 2020 and HMS Core 6.0 launched in June 2021 with extended support for Huawei's cloud services.

In June 2021, the number of registered developers within the HMS ecosystem was 4 million, and the number of apps integrations with HMS Core had reached 134,000.

As of July 2022, registered developers within HMS ecosystem grew to 5 million, and the number of apps integrated with HMS Core reached 203,000 apps.

HMS AppGallery 

The HMS AppGallery has a key rival, Google's Play Store on Android. The HMS AppGallery is available in 170 countries, across 78 languages.

By summer 2019, registered developers to develop apps for the AppGallery grew to 910,000 (from 450,000 the year previous) and Core app integration doubled in the same timeframe.

As of July 2022, registered developers grew to 5 million (from 4 million, the year previous) and Core app integration doubled in the same timeframe revealed during Huawei's HarmonyOS 3 event.

Reception 
The reception of HMS is mixed, with the majority of discussion based around the key Google/Android apps which are not yet present on the AppGallery and whether or not this presents a significant problem to users. The open development of HMS Core, has been regarded by some as benefiting the Android project as a whole, "If Huawei continues to invest in a holistically open approach... the result could be that we could all end up a bit less beholden to Google".

References

External links 
 
 Huawei Mobile Services (HMS) - Huawei Developer

Application software
Cloud applications
Mobile software